Winmarleigh is a civil parish in the Wyre district of Lancashire, England.  It contains two listed buildings that are recorded in the National Heritage List for England.  Both the listed buildings are designated at Grade II, the lowest of the three grades, which is applied to "buildings of national importance and special interest".  Other than the village of Winmarleigh, the parish is rural.  The listed buildings are a public house and a church.


Buildings

References

Citations

Sources

Lists of listed buildings in Lancashire
Buildings and structures in the Borough of Wyre